Hugh Frank Digby Pickett, CM (April 11, 1913 – February 13, 2006) was a Canadian impresario who made major contributions to Vancouver's arts and entertainment scene.

Born in Vancouver, British Columbia, he was a manager and press agent with Theatre Under the Stars.

In 1986, he was made a Member of the Order of Canada in recognition for his involvement with "Vancouver's famed Theatre Under The Stars".

References

Canadian theatre managers and producers
Members of the Order of Canada
Businesspeople from Vancouver
Impresarios
1913 births
2006 deaths